Phytoecia rabatensis is a species of beetle in the family Cerambycidae. It was described by Sama in 1992. It is known from North Africa.

References

Phytoecia
Beetles described in 1992